Czesław Sokolowski (born July 9, 1877 in Warsaw, died on November 11, 1951 in Michalin) was a Polish Roman Catholic priest, theologian, rector of the Catholic University of Lublin in 1924–1925, and at the Faculty of Catholic Theology at the University of Warsaw. He was auxiliary bishop of Siedlce from 1919 to 1940, titular bishop of Pentacomia and apostolic administrator of the diocese of Siedlce in the years 1940–1946. He was also considered to be a Nazi collaborator.

During World War II, He was one of 4 bishops considered a collaborator for striking a deal with the Nazi occupation forces. and he was sentenced to death by the Warsaw Area Special Military Court of the Polish Home Army. The verdict, however, was downgraded to a sentence of loss of civil rights and public reputation.

References 

1877 births
1951 deaths
Catholic priests convicted of crimes
Polish Roman Catholic priests
Polish prisoners sentenced to death
Academic staff of the John Paul II Catholic University of Lublin
Polish collaborators with Nazi Germany
Clergy from Warsaw
People convicted of treason against Poland
Prisoners sentenced to death by Poland